At Last, Okemah! is a 2009 short film directed by Chicago-based independent filmmaker Michael Glover Smith, based on an original screenplay by novelist Adam Selzer and Smith. The film had its world premiere at the Chicago International REEL Shorts Festival on Sunday, September 13, 2009, where it won an Audience Choice Award. It was also an Official Selection of the 2009 Asheville Film Festival, the 2010 Tallahassee Film Festival and the 2010 Chicago International Music and Movies Festival, where the film effectively "opened" a concert by cast member Jon Langford. This unique double bill was a "Recommended" screening by Cine-File, Chicago's guide to independent and alternative cinema.

Premise
At Last, Okemah! is a comedic retelling of Don Quixote featuring Jeff-nominated actor Kevin Viol in the lead role of Winston Thomas, a former hipster who becomes the self-styled greatest, most authentic folk singer of all time. After a mystical encounter, Winston embarks on a journey to Okemah, Oklahoma to be anointed by the spirit of Woody Guthrie.

History
At Last, Okemah! was shot on high definition digital video in 6 days in the spring of 2009. Most of the actors in the film are well known in the worlds of Chicago music, theater, television and independent film; in addition to Viol and Langford, the cast includes noted thespians Mia Park (host of television's Chic-a-Go-Go), Suzy Brack, Paul Perroni and Duane Sharp (star of Zen Noir). "At Last, Okemah!" is dedicated to writer Miguel de Cervantes and musician Woody Guthrie.

References

External links
 
 

2009 films
2009 independent films
American independent films
2009 comedy films
2009 short films
American comedy short films
2000s English-language films
2000s American films